The decentralized web is a research program which proposes to reorganize the Internet using peer-to-peer infrastructure rather than centralized data hosting services. Interest in the decentralized web arose due to the lack of trust in network maintenance organizations, due to scandals involving widespread espionage and content control. Proposed mechanisms include decentralized identifiers and distributed ledgers.

Decentralized identifiers 

Decentralized identifiers are an important part of decentralized web applications.  Decentralized identifiers are sometimes encapsulated in "decentralized identifier documents" (referred to as "DIDs").  Decentralized web applications frequently rely on URLs to decentralized identifier documents.   The World Wide Web Consortium has several recommendations regarding DIDs.  These identity documents are intended to identify any subject (e.g., a person, organization, thing, data model, abstract entity, etc.) that the controller of the DID decides that it identifies.

Cryptocurrency 

A decentralized currency can be a helpful element in a decentralized web platform.  A "cryptocurrency" (or crypto currency or crypto for short) is a digital asset designed to work as a medium of exchange wherein individual coin ownership records are stored in a ledger. The ledger is a form of computerized database using strong cryptography to secure transaction records, to control the creation of additional coins, and to verify the transfer of coin ownership. It typically does not exist in physical form (like paper money) and is typically not issued by a central authority. Cryptocurrencies typically use decentralized control as opposed to centralized digital currency and central banking systems.

When a cryptocurrency is minted or created prior to issuance or issued by a single issuer, it is generally considered centralized. When implemented with decentralized control, each cryptocurrency works through distributed ledger technology, typically a blockchain, that serves as a public financial transaction database.  Some decentralized web applications require cryptocurrency.

See also 

 Certificate authority - A service that cryptographically ties the domain name portion of a URL to a legal entity.
 Freenet
 Identity provider - A service that provides identity documents
 Self-sovereign identity - central paradigm of the decentralized web
 Silicon Valley (season 6), in fiction
 Web3 - a concept for a new WWW iteration
 Wireless mesh network

References 

Decentralization
World Wide Web Consortium
Peer-to-peer computing